KHMR may refer to:

 KHMR (FM), a radio station (104.3 FM) licensed to serve Lovelady, Texas, United States
 Kicking Horse Resort